René Alexis Martial Gallice (13 April 1919 – 25 May 1999) was a French footballer who played as a midfielder.

References

External links
Profile at FFF
Profile and stats

1919 births
1999 deaths
French footballers
France international footballers
Association football midfielders
Olympique de Marseille players
FC Girondins de Bordeaux players
Ligue 1 players
Ligue 2 players